Moccasin Creek is a  long 2nd order tributary to the Uwharrie River in Montgomery County, North Carolina.

Course
Moccasin Creek rises on the Dutch John Creek divide in Montgomery County about 1.5 miles west of Daniel Mountain.  Moccasin Creek then follows a semi-circular path going northeast then curving south to join the Uwharrie River about 1 mile northeast of Daniel Mountain.

Watershed
Moccasin Creek drains  of area, receives about 47.9 in/year of precipitation, has a wetness index of 314.07 and is about 88% forested.

See also
List of rivers of North Carolina

References

Rivers of North Carolina
Rivers of Montgomery County, North Carolina